The Action Party was an Italian pre-unitary political party active during the Risorgimento. It was the first organized party in the history of Italy.

History 
After the failure of the Italian revolutions of 1848, Giuseppe Mazzini's Young Italy was dissolved as a political organization to form the Italian National Association, which was still led by Mazzini.

During the 1848–1849, the Italian National Association competed against the rival Moderate Party led by Vincenzo Gioberti and Massimo d'Azeglio that won the election in the Kingdom of Sardinia and established a new government. After some years of weak activities, the Italian National Association was renamed in 1853 by Mazzini to the Action Party, which published the booklet-manifesto "To the Italians" (Agli Italiani) and invited Italians to start various rebel and republican organizations. This tactic was changed after the failed invasion of Sapri of the same year, where Carlo Pisacane died.

In 1860, the Action Party financed the creation of a paramilitary group led by Giuseppe Garibaldi named the Redshirts (Camicie rosse). The Redshirts become particularly famous for the Expedition of the Thousand, when Garibaldi conquered in a few months all of the Kingdom of the Two Sicilies and the Papal States. In this period, the Action Party was strongly opposed to the Moderate Party and its new leader Camillo Benso di Cavour, who was close to the House of Savoy. Mazzini particularly hated the annexation war, the falsification of the referendums and the Piedmontization of Italy that ignored the various diversities of a unified Italy. The Action Party founded the first mutual aid societies, workers' associations, public schools and cooperatives. In 1861, Mazzini founded the newspaper of the Action Party, L'Unità italiana. In 1867, the Action Party attempted to conclude the Unification War and take over Rome with the Battle of Mentana, which failed. Disappointed, Mazzini dissolved the Action Party and retired from politics. In 1870, Rome was captured and became the capital of the Kingdom of Italy.

In 1877, Agostino Bertani, a former member of the Action Party, left the Historical Left to form the Historical Far-Left, reputed to be the real heir of the Action Party.

Proposals and goals 
 Unification of Italy, including the "Irrident Lands".
 Abolition of the monarchy and creation of a republic.
 Elections with universal suffrage.
 Support of the freedom of religion, press, speech and thought.

Electoral results

See also 
 Liberalism and radicalism in Italy

References 

Italian unification
Kingdom of Sardinia
Defunct political parties in Italy
Defunct nationalist parties in Italy
Political parties established in 1853
Political parties disestablished in 1867
Radical parties in Italy
1848 establishments in Italy
1867 disestablishments in Italy